RC Frameries is a Belgian rugby union club currently competing in the Belgian Elite League.

The club is based in Frameries in Hainaut.
The official colours of the club are yellow and black.

History
The club was founded in 1966 and has never won the Belgian Elite League but did finish as runners up in the 2008/09 season. 
Their only victory in the Belgian Cup was in 1971.

Honours

 Belgian Elite League
 Finalist: 2009
 Belgian Super Cup
 Finalist: 2012
 Belgian Cup
 Champions: 1971
 Finalist: 2012
 Toledo Plate
 Champions: 1982, 1983, 2001
 Belgian 2nd Division
 Champions: 1971, 1980, 1991, 2004

See also
 Rugby union in Belgium
 Belgian Elite League
 Belgian Cup (Rugby Union)

References

External links
 Official site

Belgian rugby union clubs